The 2020–21 Colorado Avalanche season was the 26th operational season and 25th playing season since the franchise relocated from Quebec prior to the start of the 1995–96 NHL season. As well as the franchise's 42nd season in the National Hockey League and 49th season overall. The Avalanche  commemorated their 25th anniversary this season.

On December 20, 2020, the league temporarily realigned into four divisions with no conferences due to the COVID-19 pandemic and the ongoing closure of the Canada–United States border. As a result of this realignment, the Avalanche played this season in the West Division and only played against the other teams in their new division during the regular season and the first two rounds of the playoffs.

On April 22, the Avalanche clinched a playoff berth following a 4–2 win over the St. Louis Blues. They clinched their third Presidents' Trophy, as well as their tenth division championship, with a 5-1 victory over the Los Angeles Kings in their last game of the season on May 13. The Avalanche swept the St. Louis Blues in the First Round, with a 5–2 win in game four. In their Second Round series against the Vegas Golden Knights, the Avalanche initially led the series 2–0, but were later eliminated from the playoffs after they lost the next four games.

Standings

Divisional standings

Schedule and results

Regular season
The regular season schedule was published on December 23, 2020.

Playoffs

Player statistics
Final stats
Skaters

Goaltenders

†Denotes player spent time with another team before joining the Avalanche. Stats reflect time with the Avalanche only.
‡Denotes player was traded mid-season. Stats reflect time with the Avalanche only.
Bold/italics denotes franchise record.

Transactions 
The Avalanche have been involved in the following transactions during the 2020–21 season

Trades

Free agents

Retirement

Signings

Draft picks

Below are the Colorado Avalanches' selection at the 2020 NHL Draft that was held on October 6–7 at NHL Network Studios.

Notes

References

Colorado Avalanche

Colorado Avalanche seasons
Colorado Avalanche
Colorado Avalanche
Presidents' Trophy seasons